The 1961–62 Coppa Italia was the 15th Coppa Italia, the major Italian domestic cup. The competition was won by Napoli, who defeated SPAL in a one-legged final played at the Stadio Olimpico in Rome.

First round 
Serie B teams.

p=after penalty shoot-out

Second round 
14 clubs from Serie A are added.

p=after penalty shoot-out

Round of 16 
Vicenza, Internazionale, Roma and Torino are added.

p=after penalty shoot-out

Quarter-finals

Semi-finals

Third place match

Final

Top goalscorers

External links
rsssf.com

Coppa Italia seasons
1961–62 domestic association football cups
Copa